Stairs of Sand is a 1929 American silent Western film starring Wallace Beery, Jean Arthur and Phillips Holmes, made by Paramount Pictures, directed by Otto Brower, and written by Agnes Brand Leahy, Sam Mintz and J. Walter Ruben, based on a novel by Zane Grey. The supporting cast features Fred Kohler and Chester Conklin.

Cast
 Wallace Beery as Lacey 
 Jean Arthur as Ruth Hutt 
 Phillips Holmes as Adam Wansfell (credited as Phillips R. Holmes)
 Fred Kohler as Boss Stone 
 Chester Conklin as Tim 
 Guy Oliver as Sheriff Collishaw 
 Lillian Worth as Babe 
 Frank Rice as Stage Driver
 C.L. Sherwood as Waiter (credited as Clarence L. Sherwood)
 Leone Lane

References

External links
 
 
 Still of Wallace Beery and Jean Arthur at alamy.com

1929 films
Novels by Zane Grey
1929 Western (genre) films
Films directed by Otto Brower
American black-and-white films
Silent American Western (genre) films
1920s American films